Dana Wheeler-Nicholson (born October 9, 1960) is an American actress and singer best known for her roles in the films Fletch (1985), Tombstone (1993), Fast Food Nation (2006) and Parkland (2013). She is also known for her roles on television series such as Friday Night Lights, Seinfeld and Nashville.

Personal life
Wheeler-Nicholson was born in New York City, the daughter of Joan (née Weitemeyer) and Douglas Wheeler-Nicholson. She is the granddaughter of pioneering American comic book publisher Malcolm Wheeler-Nicholson, who founded DC Comics under the original company name National Allied Publications. Wheeler-Nicholson has been married to film director Alex Smith since 2011 and lives in Austin, Texas.

Career
Sometimes credited as Dana Wheeler Nicholson, she has appeared in numerous feature films, but is perhaps best known for her role in Fletch (1985) as Gail Stanwyk, the love interest of the title character. She is well known for her performance in Tombstone (1993) as Mattie Blaylock, Wyatt Earp's common law wife. Wheeler-Nicholson has also appeared in the films Bye Bye Love (1995), Denise Calls Up (1995), Fast Food Nation (2006), and Parkland (2013).

On television, Wheeler-Nicholson has guest-starred in Seinfeld, Law & Order, Law & Order: Criminal Intent, The X-Files, Sex and the City, Boston Public, and Boston Legal. She starred in the short-lived comedy Beverly Hills Buntz from 1987 to 1988, and in 2001 was cast on the daytime soap opera All My Children. In the mid-2000s, Wheeler-Nicholson moved from Los Angeles to Austin, Texas. From 2007 to 2011, she had a recurring role in the television drama Friday Night Lights as Angela Collette. In 2014, Wheeler-Nicholson played the role of character Scarlett O'Connor's abusive mother on the musical drama series Nashville. In 2015, she had a supporting role in the independent drama film 6 Years.

Filmography

Film

Television

References

External links
 

1960 births
20th-century American actresses
21st-century American actresses
Actresses from Austin, Texas
Actresses from New York City
American film actresses
American soap opera actresses
American television actresses
Living people